Peter James Mikolajewski (born February 26, 1943) is a former American football quarterback who played one season with the San Diego Chargers of the American Football League. He played college football at Kent State University and attended Piqua Catholic School in Piqua, Ohio.

References

External links
Just Sports Stats
College stats

Living people
1943 births
Players of American football from Virginia
American football quarterbacks
Kent State Golden Flashes football players
San Diego Chargers players
Sportspeople from Portsmouth, Virginia
American Football League players